TMR may refer to:

Companies
 Tokio Millennium Re Ltd., is a reinsurance company headquartered in Bermuda
 Transports de Martigny et Régions, a Swiss railway company

People
 Matthew Berry (born 1969), known as TMR, a fantasy football player
 The Mexican Runner or Piotr Delgado Kusielczuk, a speedrunner
 TM Revolution, the Japanese musician Takanori Nishikawa

Other uses
 Aguenar – Hadj Bey Akhamok Airport, IATA airport identifier
 Department of Transport and Main Roads, Queensland, Australia
 Jewish Babylonian Aramaic, ISO 639-3 language code
 Mount Royal, Quebec, Canada
 Rolls-Royce Thrust Measuring Rig, VTOL aircraft
 Tetramethylrhodamine, a derivative of rhodamine
 Catalog numbers of Third Man Records
 Total Mixed Ration, a method of feeding cattle
 Transmyocardial revascularization, heart disease treatment
 Triple modular redundancy, a computing voting system
 Tunnel magnetoresistance
 Trout Mask Replica, an experimental rock album by Captain Beefheart & His Magic Band